The Philippines Biofuels Act 2006 requires oil companies to use biofuels in all "liquid fuels for motors and engines sold in the Philippines." All gasoline sold in the country must contain at least 5 percent ethanol by February 2009, and by 2011, the mandated blend can go up to 10 percent. The new law is expected to bring a number of benefits to the country:

"Commercial production of ethanol from sugarcane, cassava or sorghum will help the island nation diversify its fuel portfolio and help to ensure its energy security. It could also generate employment, particularly in rural regions, as investors put up biofuel crop plantations and processing plants. Also, the shift to these plant-based fuels for transportation will help reduce pollution."

Four feedstocks—sugarcane, corn, cassava and sweet sorghum—were initially identified for ethanol production, but sugarcane is expected to be the predominant source of ethanol. The Philippines is a sugar-producing country, and sugarcane is grown mainly in the islands of Negros, Luzon, Panay and Mindanao. Despite growing demand for sugar, there are still an estimated 90,750 hectares (224,000 acres) of sugarcane available that can be used for ethanol production, and high-yielding varieties of sugarcane are available.

Introduction
In 2005, Seaoil pioneered the use of ethanol as gasoline blend in the country, and the first to offer E10 Fuel in the market in their gasoline products. This was done even before the enactment of the Biofuels Act of 2006.

In July 2008, Pilipinas Shell and Petron Corporation introduced 95 Octane E10 Gasoline alongside their Unleaded (93 Octane) and Premium Unleaded (95 Octane) variants.

See also

Common ethanol fuel mixtures
 Ethanol fuel by country
Ethanol fuel in Australia
Ethanol fuel in Brazil
Ethanol fuel in Sweden
Ethanol fuel in the United States
Flexible-fuel vehicle
List of renewable energy topics by country

References

Ethanol fuel
Renewable energy in the Philippines